Marian Popa (born 3 March 1964) is a Romanian former football striker. On 9 June 1993 he scored six goals for Farul Constanța in a Divizia A match against Oțelul Galați which ended with a 6–3 victory. In 1994 he played in the first ever Supercupa României, scoring the only goal of the game against Gloria Bistrița, helping Steaua win the trophy.

International career
Marian Popa played two friendly games at international level for Romania, both of them being victories against Israel.

Honours
Farul Constanța
Divizia B: 1987–88
Steaua București
Divizia A: 1994–95
Cupa României: 1991–92
Supercupa României: 1994

References

External links

1964 births
Living people
Romanian footballers
Romania international footballers
Association football forwards
Liga I players
Liga II players
Nemzeti Bajnokság I players
FCV Farul Constanța players
FC Steaua București players
FC Brașov (1936) players
Budapesti VSC footballers
Romanian expatriate footballers
Expatriate footballers in Hungary
Expatriate sportspeople in Hungary
Romanian expatriates in Hungary
Romanian expatriate sportspeople in Hungary
Sportspeople from Constanța